Aladár Dobsa (28 December 1931 – 1 October 2016) was a Hungarian sports shooter. He competed in the 25 metre pistol event at the 1968 Summer Olympics.

References

External links
 

1931 births
2016 deaths
Hungarian male sport shooters
Olympic shooters of Hungary
Shooters at the 1968 Summer Olympics
People from Komló
Sportspeople from Baranya County